Knuckle Puck is an American rock band, formed in 2010 in the suburbs of Chicago, Illinois. The group released several EPs, one of which, While I Stay Secluded (2014), peaked at number 5 on the Heatseekers Albums chart. The band released a split EP with the UK band Neck Deep. The group signed to Rise in 2014 and released its debut album, Copacetic, through the label in 2015.

The band's name comes from the "knucklepuck" shot in ice hockey, which was popularized by the 1994 film D2: The Mighty Ducks.

History

Formation and early releases (2010–2014)
Knuckle Puck started out covering songs in fall 2010 in the outskirts of Chicago. The band got its name from a Stick to Your Guns t-shirt that said "Knuckle Puck Crew". The band consisted of lead vocalist Joe Taylor, lead guitarist Kevin Maida, and drummer John Siorek. The group started writing original songs in April 2011 with the addition of rhythm guitarist Nick Casasanto. The group had friends fill in on bass. In July, the band played its first ever show. In October, the band released a self-titled EP, this was followed up by the Acoustics EP in March 2012. In October, the band released the Don't Come Home EP. The band co-headlined a tour with Seaway from late May to early June 2013. In August, the band self-released The Weight That You Buried EP. In February 2014 Bad Timing and Hopeless released a split EP that featured two songs each from Knuckle Puck and Neck Deep. Both bands toured together (alongside Light Years) from late February to early April. On March 16, the band performed at South by So What?! festival. In spring, the band gained bassist Ryan Rumchaks. Between May and June, the band supported Man Overboard on the group's The Heart Attack Tour alongside Transit, and Forever Came Calling.

A music video was released for the song "No Good" in June. It was directed by Eric Teti. In late July, it was announced the band were recording, and in early August the band finished recording its next release. Knuckle Puck supported Senses Fail on the band's Let It Enfold You 10th anniversary tour from late August till early October 2014. In early September, the band released a 7" flexi containing the songs "Oak Street" and "Home Alone", the former of which was intended for release on the group's next EP. The flexi was released by Bad Timing. On October 16, 2014, "Bedford Falls" was available for streaming. On October 23, the While I Stay Secluded EP was made available for streaming and on October 28, it was released by Bad Timing. The EP had peaked at number 5 on the Heatseekers Albums in the U.S. Guitarist Kevin Maida revealed that the band "firmly and confidently" considered the EP the group's best work so far. On October 31, the band released a music video for "Oak Street". In November and December, the band supported Modern Baseball on the group's winter tour.

Copacetic and Shapeshifter (2014–2020)

In November 2014, the various artists compilation album Punk Goes Pop 6 was released, it featured Knuckle Puck covering The 1975 song "Chocolate". On December 22, 2014, Knuckle Puck signed to Rise Records. Maida said that Rise would be "a bountiful new home" for the group and would help the band evolve. Throughout January and February 2015 the band supported Neck Deep on the band's The Intercontinental Championships Tour. In late February, the band announced it had started recording its debut album and by early April, the group had finished. The group joined The Maine's The American Candy Spring 2015 Tour, as a support act, throughout April and May. On June 11, the band's debut album, Copacetic, was announced. The artwork and track list was revealed. On June 19, a music video was released for "Disdain". On June 30, "True Contrite" was made available for streaming. The band played on the 2015 edition of Warped Tour. On July 14, "Pretense" was made available for streaming. On July 23, the album was made available for streaming. Copacetic released on July 31. The band supported State Champs on the group's European tour in September and October. The band toured the U.S. in October and November, with support from Seaway, Head North and Sorority Noise. In February and March 2016, the band supported Neck Deep and State Champs on the groups' co-headlining tour of the U.S.

In March 2017, a 7-inch vinyl single was released, featuring the tracks "Calendar Days" and "Indecisive". On July 27, the band released the first single from their at the time upcoming album onto YouTube and iTunes titled "Gone". A few months later in September the second single "Double Helix" was released on YouTube with its music video. The group released their second album, Shapeshifter, on October 13.

In October 2019 Knuckle Puck released a 7" vinyl containing Gold Rush and Fences, previously released with Neck Deep and containing two more tracks. This vinyl sold out in a few hours.

20/20 (2020–present) 
On February 21, 2020, the band released a single called "Tune You Out", and commenced a tour across North America with Heart Attack Man throughout February and March 2020, which was cut short by the onset of the COVID-19 pandemic. On April 21, 2020, a second single and 7" record "RSVP" was released. A music video for the song "Breathe" was released on June 18, 2020, the song features Derek Sanders from the band Mayday Parade. The band released their third album 20/20 on September 18, 2020. The band played multiple drive in shows in October 2020 with Hot Mulligan. In December 2021, the band headlined a tour celebrating their tenth anniversary with Arm's Length, Carly Cosgrove, and Snow Ellet.

On December 1, 2021, the band released a single "Levitate" and announced a US and European tour from March 2022 to June 2022 with co-headliner Hot Mulligan with support by Meet Me at the Altar and Anxious during the US shows. The band released an extended play Disposable Life on February 4, 2022, with Joe Taylor calling the recording of the EP "the most fun we've had in a long time" The band supported New Found Glory on the group's US tour through September 2022 to November 2022.

On October 20, 2022, the band announced that they had signed with Pure Noise Records and released a new single Groundhog Day. The band announced that their upcoming 4th LP would release in 2024.  The band later announced a compilation vinyl release Retrospective consisting of their first two EP's and their split with Neck Deep.

Style
Knuckle Puck sound has been described by AllMusic biographer James Christopher Monger as a "melodic blend of old-school punk rock and emo", compared to the likes of The Wonder Years, The Story So Far, and Rise Against. Copacetic has been described as emo and pop punk. AllMusic reviewer Timothy Monger noted the album's sound "ranging from blazing, epic emo and pop-punk to slower, more contemplative fare." Cleveland.com reviewer Troy L. Smith noted that people who liked early 2000s pop punk albums such as Simple Plan's No Pads, No Helmets...Just Balls (2002) and New Found Glory's Sticks and Stones (2002) would enjoy Copacetic.

Side projects
Rumchaks released a solo EP, Decades, in July 2013. Rumchaks plays guitar and sings vocals in Oak Lawn, Illinois-based band Homesafe, alongside vocalist/bassist Tyler Albertson and drummer Eman Duran. The group has released three EPs and one full-length studio album, Homesafe (2014), Inside Your Head (2015), ‘’Evermore’’ (2016), And ‘’ONE’’ (2018). Homesafe is currently signed to Pure Noise Records.

Taylor and Rumchaks joined with Real Friends' vocalist Dan Lambton to form Rationale. With Rationale., Taylor plays guitar and vocals, Rumchaks plays drums, and Lambton on guitar and vocals. "Hangnail" was made available for streaming in December 2015, and the group's debut EP Confines  followed shortly after.

Kevin Maida plays guitar in Chicago hardcore-punk band Lurk.

John Siorek has played drums for bands William Bonney and Droughts.

Critical reception
Knuckle Puck was included on Alternative Presss "12 Bands You Need To Know: AP Editors pick their favorite 100 Bands" list in 2014. The band were included on Idobi's "Artists To Watch In 2014" list.

Knuckle Puck was nominated for the Best Underground Band in the 2015 Alternative Press Music Awards.

Knuckle Puck was nominated for Album of the Year and Best Breakthrough Band in the 2016 Alternative Press Music Awards.

Band members
Current members
 Joe Taylor – lead vocals (2010–present)
 Kevin Maida – lead guitar (2010–present)
 John Siorek – drums, percussion (2010–present)
 Nick Casasanto – rhythm guitar, co-lead vocals (2011–present)
 Ryan Rumchaks – bass guitar (2012–present),  backing vocals (2017–present)

Discography

Studio albums
 Copacetic (2015)
 Shapeshifter (2017)
 20/20 (2020)

References
Footnotes

Citations

Sources

External links

Knuckle Puck on Bandcamp

Musical groups from Chicago
Rise Records artists
Musical groups established in 2010
Pop punk groups from Illinois
2010 establishments in Illinois